is a railway station in the city of Okazaki, Aichi, Japan, operated by Meitetsu.

Lines
Miai Station is served by the Meitetsu Nagoya Main Line and is 25.6 kilometers from the terminus of the line at Toyohashi Station.

Station layout
The station has two elevated island platforms connected by an elevated station building. The station has automated ticket machines, Manaca automated turnstiles and is staffed.

Platforms

Adjacent stations

Station history
Miai Station was opened on 1 April 1926 as a station on the privately held Aichi Electric Railway. The Aichi Electric Railway was acquired by the Meitetsu Group on 1 August 1935. The station platforms and tracks were elevated in December 1987 and the station building was rebuilt at that time.

Passenger statistics
In fiscal 2017, the station was used by an average of 8,402 passengers daily.

Surrounding area
 Aichi College of Agriculture
 Okazaki Technical High School

See also
 List of Railway Stations in Japan

References

External links

 Official web page 

Railway stations in Japan opened in 1926
Railway stations in Aichi Prefecture
Stations of Nagoya Railroad
Okazaki, Aichi